HMS Crossbow was a  of the Royal Navy that was in service from 1948 and scrapped in 1972.

Service
On commissioning in 1948 Crossbow formed part of the 6th Destroyer Flotilla (later Squadron), as part of the Home Fleet, along with the other Weapon-class destroyers. In 1953 she took part in the Fleet Review to celebrate the Coronation of Queen Elizabeth II.

In 1957 all of the Weapon class were taken into refit and conversion to re-equip them as radar pickets, to supplement the new s. Crossbow was converted at Chatham Dockyard. The conversion involved the removal of both sets of torpedo tubes and the erection of an additional lattice mast, which carried a large Type 965 Radar (AKE -1 aerial). Crossbow re-commissioned in 1959 and was then allocated to the 2nd Destroyer Squadron. She was present at Chatham Navy Days in April 1960.

Decommissioning and disposal
In 1963 Crossbow was reduced to operational reserve and three years later relieved the destroyer  as the harbor training ship for the shore establishment . She was replaced in that role by the destroyer  early in 1970. She was placed on the disposal list and sold to Thos. W. Ward for scrapping and arrived at their yard at Briton Ferry on 21 January 1972.

References

Publications
 
 

 

Weapon-class destroyers
1945 ships
Cold War destroyers of the United Kingdom
Ships built by John I. Thornycroft & Company